Chaetodactyla is a genus of beetles in the family Carabidae, containing the following species:

 Chaetodactyla alluaudi Tschitscherine, 1899
 Chaetodactyla basilewskyi Deuve, 1983
 Chaetodactyla brancsiki (Tschitscherine, 1898)
 Chaetodactyla catalai (Jeannel, 1948)
 Chaetodactyla decorsei (Tschitscherine, 1903)
 Chaetodactyla descarpentriesi Deuve, 1980
 Chaetodactyla feronioides (Tschitscherine, 1897)
 Chaetodactyla lambertoni Deuve, 1983
 Chaetodactyla mirabilis Tschitscherine, 1897
 Chaetodactyla olsoufieffi (Alluaud, 1935)
 Chaetodactyla pauliani (Jeannel, 1955)
 Chaetodactyla peyrierasi Deuve, 1980
 Chaetodactyla robusta Deuve, 1980
 Chaetodactyla seyrigi (Alluaud, 1935)
 Chaetodactyla simulans Deuve, 1983
 Chaetodactyla sinuaticollis Deuve, 1980
 Chaetodactyla sphodroides Deuve, 1980
 Chaetodactyla striatipennis Deuve, 1983
 Chaetodactyla thoracica (Jeannel, 1948)
 Chaetodactyla vicina Deuve, 1980

References

Pterostichinae